Kongkrailas United Football Club (Thai สโมสรฟุตบอล กงไกรลาศ ยูไนเต็ด), is a Thai football club based in Mueang, Sukhothai, Thailand. The club is currently playing in the Thai League 3 Northern region.

History
In early 2022, the club was established and competed in Thailand Amateur League Northern region, using the Thalay Luang Stadium as ground. At the end of the season, the club could be promoted to the Thai League 3. They use the Thalay Luang Stadium as a ground to compete for the T3 in the 2022–23 season.

In late 2022, Kongkrailas United competed in the Thai League 3 for the 2022–23 season. It is their first season in the professional league. The club started the season with a 0–2 away defeat to Wat Bot City and they ended the season with a 0–1 home defeat to the Wat Bot City. The club has finished eleventh place in the league of the Northern region. In addition, in the 2022–23 Thai League Cup Kongkrailas United was defeated 1–5 to Uttaradit Saksiam in the first qualifying round, causing them to be eliminated.

Stadium and locations

Season by season record

P = Played
W = Games won
D = Games drawn
L = Games lost
F = Goals for
A = Goals against
Pts = Points
Pos = Final position

QR1 = First Qualifying Round
QR2 = Second Qualifying Round
R1 = Round 1
R2 = Round 2
R3 = Round 3
R4 = Round 4

R5 = Round 5
R6 = Round 6
QF = Quarter-finals
SF = Semi-finals
RU = Runners-up
W = Winners

Players

Current squad

References

External links
 Thai League official website
 Club's info from Thai League official website

Association football clubs established in 2022
Football clubs in Thailand
Sukhothai province
2022 establishments in Thailand